Vladimir Nikolavevich Yakovlev (Russian: Влади́мир Никола́евич Я́ковлев; born August 17, 1954, Kalinin) is a former Russian military commander who was the commander of the RVSN from 1997 to 2001.

Early life 
He was born in Kalinin, now Tver, the administrative center of Tver Oblast, Russia. He applied to Kalinin Suvorov Military School, but failed the admissions exam. He graduated with honors from his local high school in 1971.

He entered Kharkov Higher Military Command-Engineering School. He established himself as a competent team leader and was made a course leader.

Yakovlev then went to college, graduating in 1976, which led to an assignment in a missile regiment.

Career 

Yakovlev served as an engineer, senior engineer and team leader. Due to his success at Combat Duty alerting, Yakovlev was appointed Chief of Staff of the missile regiment in 1981.

In 1983, Yakovlev enrolled in the command school of the Dzerzhinsky Military Academy (:ru:Военная академия РВСН им. Петра Великого), graduating in 1985. While there, he earned a gold medal and then was sent to become the post commander of the 6th Guards missile regiment of Riga (Pervomais'k-on-Bug). In 1989, he became deputy commander of a missile division.

In 1991, Yakovlev was appointed Guard Division Commander of the 60th Missile Division in the city Tatishevo-5 in the Tatischevskogo district of Saratov region. Yakovlev made special efforts to improve the living conditions of military families residing there.

In 1993, Yakovlev was appointed chief of staff of the 60th Missile Division, and in 1994 was made Commander of the 27th Guards Rocket Army in Vladimir Oblast.

In December 1996, Yakovlev was appointed Chief of Staff of the Strategic Missile Forces. In July, 1997, he became, at age 43, the youngest-ever Chief of the Strategic Missile Forces. His next promotion, to General, was awarded by Presidential Decree of Vladimir Putin on June 27, 2000. 

In April, 2001, Yakovlev was released from his post of Commander in connection with the conversion of the Strategic Missile Forces of the Armed Forces. He was appointed chief of staff for coordination of military cooperation for the Commonwealth of Independent States. He remained there until 2004. He served as an advisor during 2006 - 2009 to the CEO of  FSUE "Rosoboronexport".

From December 2009 to May 2012, Yakovlev was chief of the Military Academy of the General Staff of the Armed Forces of the Russian Federation.

As of 2014 he remained a corresponding Member of the Russian Academy of Missile and Artillery Sciences, Academician of the Russian Academy of Engineering, Professor of the Academy of Military Sciences of the Russian Federation and Candidate of Military Sciences (1997). He received the Laureate of the President of the Russian Federation in the field of education for 1998.

Yakovlev currently resides in Moscow. He is married and has two daughters.

References 

Generals of the army (Russia)
Strategic Rocket Forces
1954 births
Living people
People from Tver